Blenko Glass Company, located in Milton, West Virginia, makes hand-blown glass.

History

William J. Blenko 
William J. Blenko was born in London, England in 1853. He worked in a glass factory in his youth. In 1893, he emigrated to Kokomo, Indiana, in the US, where he established the first American factory to produce sheet glass for stained glass windows. In 1903, he was forced to close his factory and return to England as a result of an economic downturn.

His second business venture was in 1909, in Point Marion, Pennsylvania. This endeavor quickly failed, as did a third, in Clarksburg, West Virginia. At that time, Blenko found work at other established Ohio and West Virginia glass companies and purportedly received a job offer from Louis Comfort Tiffany.

Founding of the company 
In 1921, Blenko started another sheet glass company, this time it was set up in Milton, West Virginia becausecof low natural gas prices in the area, a major concern for glass manufacturers of the time, which drew many prospective glassblowers to the area. His new company was initially named Eureka Glass Company, later changed the name to Blenko. Until the arrival of his son, William H. Blenko, in 1923, he had no employees; he made and sold all of the glass himself.

Soon after the onset of the Great Depression, which severely damaged the stained glass market, Blenko began to produce stemware and tableware, after finding two expert glassblowers to work for the company in 1930. However, this did not mean the end of Blenko’s stained glass industry.  Blenko Glass Company still produces hand-blown sheet glass for use in stained glass windows, as well as architectural glass.

Blenko's early work include providing glass for the stained glass windows of St. Patrick's Cathedral in New York City. Prior to 1946, Blenko's tableware output was largely functional and classical in form. Macy's started to sell Blenko products in 1932. The White House has a collection of Blenko table ware, which is used periodically.

In 1980, the Blenko Glass Company started a yearly tradition to produce limited-edition glass bowls celebrating West Virginia's founding birthday.

Since 2000 
In 2005, a court judgement ordered the company to pay $500,000 to its gas supplier Big Two Mile, which precipitated Blenko's financial troubles. In 2009, the company announced it was shutting down production. 20 of its 50 employees had already been laid off. The Blenko Glass Company filed for Chapter 11 bankruptcy in May 2011. In August 2012 Blenko Vice President Katie Trippe announced that Blenko Glass was reopening after filing for bankruptcy protection.  A reorganization plan was accepted by the court in December 2012, clearing the way for the company to exit bankruptcy in early 2013.  The company exited bankruptcy in 2013 and continued to produce art glass for the consumer market.  Despite increased fuel costs, a short period of inactivity, and a rapidly changing industry and marketplace, the company continued to produce glass art ware.  On August 3, 2015, the eighth annual festival of glass was held in Milton, West Virginia.

As of 2020 Blenko no longer produces architectural sheet glass.

The Blenko factory

The Blenko Glass Company is housed in a multi-building facility including the Visitor's Center, office building and manufacturing, shipping and warehouse facilities. The Visitor's Center's first floor contains items available for sale including "seconds", while the upper floor contains a small display of Blenko's historical work, primarily early pieces from the 1930s and some experimental pieces and most notably includes a gallery of stained-glass windows made with Blenko sheet glass by different artisans.

Attached to the Visitor's Center is an observation area, allowing visitors to watch as the glass is blown. Beside the center is a “garden of glass”, installed by Joel Myers, on the shore of a small, man-made lake bordering the factory, strewn with colorful glass shards which border a small trail that winds around part of the factory. Myers' early work included a series of glass hands missing a finger after he, himself lost a finger in Blenko's workshop.

The factory contains eight furnaces that run continuously.

The Blenko Museum 
The Blenko Museum opened in 2000. Aside from curating year-long exhibitions of the company's work, the Blenko Museum worked with the Corning Museum of Glass in 2005 to include Blenko in a small survey exhibition organized by Tina Oldknow, Curator of Modern Glass, titled “Decades in Glass: the ‘50s” featuring Wayne Husted's designs.

Filmography 

 (documentary) Blenko: Hearts of Glass, PBS
 (documentary) Retro Blenko; Three Designers of American Glass, PBS

Places with Blenko stained glass 

 Washington National Cathedral
 Reims Cathedral
 United States Air Force Academy Cadet Chapel

References

Further reading
Blenko glass 1930-1953 by Eason Eige and Rick Wilson; research by Richard Blenko, Marietta, Ohio: Antique Publications, 1987, 144p
Blenko; Uniquely American Modernist Glass Published in The Journal of Antiques and Collectibles, Vol. V No. 2, April 2004
Blenko Glass: For Museums and the Masses Published in Modernism Magazine, Volume 10, No. 3, Fall, 2007

External links
Blenko Glass Company

Glassmaking companies of the United States
Glass museums and galleries in the United States
Manufacturing companies based in West Virginia
Art museums and galleries in West Virginia
Industry museums in West Virginia
Museums in Cabell County, West Virginia
American stained glass artists and manufacturers